"Together" is a 1928 popular song with music by Ray Henderson and lyrics by Buddy G. DeSylva and Lew Brown. The most popular 1928 recording of the song, by Paul Whiteman, with Bix Beiderbecke on cornet, was a #1 hit for two weeks.

The song was included in a 1944 movie, Since You Went Away. This gave rise to a revival of the song, and it was recorded by Dick Haymes and Helen Forrest in a duet. Their recording was released by Decca Records as catalog number 23349. It first reached the Billboard magazine Best Seller chart on October 5, 1944 and lasted 10 weeks on the chart, peaking at #3. This recording was paired on a single with "It Had to Be You," a #4 hit, producing a big two-sided hit.

"Together" became a Top Ten hit in the summer of 1961 via a recording by Connie Francis cut in New York City on 3 June 1961 with Cliff Parman acting as arranger and conductor. After focusing on new material for her recent singles releases, Francis with "Together" reverted to the mode of remaking traditional pop songs which had provided her with her biggest hits in the 1950s. "Together" reached #6 on the Billboard Hot 100 and was the first single release by Francis which could avail itself of the July 1961 inauguration of Billboard'''s Easy Listening chart where "Together" peaked at #1. Francis' "Together" also reached #2 in Australia, #6 in the UK, #7 in Ireland and #6 in New Zealand and was a #1 hit in India.

"Together" was the title cut for a 1964 collaborative album by Marvin Gaye and Mary Wells which - apart from the original songs "Once Upon a Time" and "What's the Matter with You Baby" released as a single- consisted of remakes of traditional pop songs. "Together" was also the title cut of a 1976 Anne Murray album. See Together (Marvin Gaye and Mary Wells album); Together (Anne Murray album).

A recording of "Together" plays in the background on the John Lennon and Yoko Ono album Two Virgins, released in 1968 on Apple Records.

Recorded versions

Louis Armstrong
Mildred Bailey
Count Basie
Sathima Bea Benjamin
Beverley Sisters
Teresa Brewer
Dave Brubeck
Ray Charles
Rosemary Clooney
Dorothy Collins
Bing Crosby included the song in a medley on his album On the Sentimental Side'' (1962).
Cass Daley
Eddie "Lockjaw" Davis
Jimmy Dorsey
Billy Eckstine
Cliff "Ukulele Ike" Edwards
Les Elgart

Connie Francis
Marvin Gaye
Benny Goodman
Ken Griffin
Dick Haymes and Helen Forrest
Eddy Howard
Keith Ingham
Arnold Johnson and his orchestra
Stan Kenton
Wayne King
Andy Kirk
Guy Lombardo
Gordon MacRae
Mantovani
Anne Murray
Red Nichols

Brian Ogilvie
The Old Mill Dance Kings
Billy Preston
P.J. Proby
The Ravens
Edmundo Ros
Artie Shaw
Dinah Shore
Frank Sinatra
Soulful Strings
Rex Stewart
Frank Weir
Mary Wells
Paul Weston and his orchestra
Paul Whiteman Orchestra featuring Bix Beiderbecke
Joe Williams

See also
List of number-one adult contemporary singles of 1961 (U.S.)

References

1928 songs
1961 singles
Connie Francis songs
Songs with music by Ray Henderson
Songs with lyrics by Buddy DeSylva
Songs with lyrics by Lew Brown
MGM Records singles
Anne Murray songs
Guy Lombardo songs